Branjin Vrh (Hungarian: Baranyavár) is a settlement in the region of Baranja, Croatia. Administratively, it is located in the Beli Manastir municipality within the Osijek-Baranja County.

See also
Osijek-Baranja County
Baranja

References

Populated places in Osijek-Baranja County
Baranya (region)